Alice Mitchell Rivlin (born Georgianna Alice Mitchell; March 4, 1931 – May 14, 2019) was an American economist and budget official. She served as the 16th vice chair of the Federal Reserve from 1996 to 1999. Before her appointment to the Federal Reserve, Rivlin was named director of the Office of Management and Budget in the Clinton administration from 1994 to 1996. Prior to that, she was instrumental in the establishment of the Congressional Budget Office and became its founding director from 1975 to 1983. A member of the Democratic Party, Rivlin was the first woman to hold either of those posts.

While not in government, Dr. Rivlin was a senior fellow for Economic Studies at the Brookings Institution and a visiting professor at the McCourt School of Public Policy of Georgetown University. She was a noted expert on the U.S. federal budget and macroeconomic policy; and co-chaired, with retired U.S. Senator Pete Domenici (R-NM), the Bipartisan Policy Center's Debt Reduction Task Force.

Early life and education
Georgianna Alice Mitchell was born in Philadelphia, the daughter of Georgianna Peck (Fales) and Allan C. G. Mitchell. She was the granddaughter of astronomer Samuel Alfred Mitchell. She grew up in Bloomington, Indiana, where her father was on the faculty of Indiana University. She briefly attended University High School in Bloomington before leaving to attend high school at Madeira School. She then went on to study at Bryn Mawr College. Initially, she wanted to major in history, but after taking an economics course at Indiana University, she decided to change her major to economics.

Rivlin earned her Bachelor of Arts in 1952, writing her senior thesis on the economic integration of Western Europe, and upon graduation, she moved to Europe where she worked on the Marshall Plan. Originally, Rivlin wanted to attend graduate school in public administration but was rejected on the grounds that she was a woman of marriageable age. Rivlin earned a Ph.D. in economics from Radcliffe College of Harvard University in 1958.

Career
Alice Rivlin was affiliated several times with the Brookings Institution, including stints in 1957–1966, 1969–1975, 1983–1993, and 1999 to her death. She was a visiting professor at Georgetown University's McCourt School of Public Policy. From 1968 to 1969, she was appointed by President Lyndon B. Johnson as Assistant Secretary for Planning and Evaluation, United States Department of Health, Education, and Welfare. In 1971 she authored Systematic Thinking for Social Action. She was elected a Fellow of the American Academy of Arts and Sciences in 1973.

Rivlin was the first director of the newly established Congressional Budget Office (CBO) during 1975–1983. As head of the CBO, she was a persistent and vociferous critic of Reaganomics. She named 1983 MacArthur Fellow in recognition of her role as CBO creator. After that Dr. Rivlin served as the deputy director of Office of Management and Budget (OMB) from 1993 to 1994 and was elevated to OMB director from 1994 to 1996 both in the Clinton administration. President Clinton nominated her as the Vice Chair of the Federal Reserve from 1996 to 1999. Upon confirmation, Rivlin became the highest-ranked woman in the history of the Federal Reserve at that time. She was also chair of the District of Columbia Financial Responsibility and Management Assistance Authority from 1998 to 2001.

In 2012, she received a Foremother Award from the National Research Center for Women & Families.

Rivlin was on the Board of Directors at the National Institute for Civil Discourse (NICD). The institute was created at the University of Arizona after the tragic shooting of former Congresswoman Gabrielle Giffords in 2011, that killed 6 people and wounded 13 others.

Debt reduction/fiscal management panels in 2010
Rivlin and former Senator Pete Domenici (R-NM) were named in January 2010 to chair a Debt Reduction Task Force, sponsored by the Bipartisan Policy Center in Washington, D.C.

Rivlin soon thereafter was named by President Obama to his 18-member bipartisan National Commission on Fiscal Responsibility and Reform panel chaired by former Senator Alan K. Simpson, (R-WY), and former White House Chief of Staff Erskine Bowles (D), commonly known as the Simpson-Bowles Commission. The balance of the panel is three more members appointed by the President, six members of the United States House of Representatives, and six members of the United States Senate. The commission first met on April 27, 2010, and had a December report deadline. A health-care component of the overall U.S. federal and state fiscal-management challenge was addressed by a panel including Rivlin on The Diane Rehm Show in June.

Along with former Comptroller General David Walker, Rivlin danced the Harlem Shake in a video produced by The Can Kicks Back, a nonpartisan group that aims to organize millennials to pressure lawmakers to address the United States' $16.4 trillion debt. The video concludes with her making an importuned plea to the twenty-somethings seated around the room: "There's no dancing around the fact that more needs to be done quickly to put our future debt on a downward track. But our leaders need to hear from you."

Personal life
Rivlin was of Cornish ancestry. In 1955, she married former Justice Department attorney Lewis Allen Rivlin of the Rivlin family, with whom she had three children; they divorced in 1977, although she kept his surname professionally. In 1989, she married economist Sidney G. Winter. She died in Washington, D.C., on May 14, 2019, aged 88.

Awards
Golden Plate Award of the American Academy of Achievement, 1987
First winner of the Carolyn Shaw Bell Award, 1998
Daniel Patrick Moynihan Prize winner, 2008 from the American Academy of Political and Social Science
Foremother Award from the National Center for Health Research, 2012
One of the members of the inaugural class of the Government Hall of Fame, 2019, posthumous

Bibliography

See also 
 List of female United States Cabinet members

References

External links
Home page at the Brookings Institution

Interview with the Minneapolis Fed
Interview with Federal Reserve
Testimony of Alice Rivlin to Congress, October 5, 1977, on the potential energy savings of urban transportation. 
Alice Rivlin profile at LittleSis
Statements and Speeches of Alice M. Rivlin

1931 births
2019 deaths
20th-century American economists
20th-century American women
21st-century American economists
21st-century American women
American people of Cornish descent
American women economists
Brookings Institution people
Bryn Mawr College alumni
Clinton administration cabinet members
Deaths from cancer in Washington, D.C.
Directors of the Congressional Budget Office
Directors of the Office of Management and Budget
Distinguished Fellows of the American Economic Association
Economists from Pennsylvania
Fellows of the American Academy of Arts and Sciences
MacArthur Fellows
Madeira School alumni
McCourt School of Public Policy faculty
Obama administration personnel
Presidents of the American Economic Association
Radcliffe College alumni
Vice Chairs of the Federal Reserve
Washington, D.C., Democrats
Women members of the Cabinet of the United States
Writers from Bloomington, Indiana
Writers from Philadelphia